Jamil Al Midfai (Arabic: جميل المدفعي; (1958 – 1890))  was an Iraqi politician. He served as the country's prime minister on five separate occasions.

Biography
Born in the town of Mosul, Midfai served in the Ottoman army during World War I, but deserted in 1916 to take part in the nationalist Arab Revolt. After the war, he was an aide to the Emir Faisal during his brief reign in Syria. He returned to Iraq in 1920, but was soon forced into exile in Jordan because of his anti-British nationalist activities. Upon his return in 1923, he served in various senior provincial capacities and finally joined the cabinet in 1930.

He was elected as the president of the Chamber of Deputies from December 1930 to November 1931, and from November 1931 to November 1933.

As a seasoned politician and two-time prime minister, he was asked to form a new government in August 1937, following the assassination of General Bakr Sidqi, who had ruled the country as a military dictator for almost a year. A staunch monarchist, Midfai was again forced into exile to Transjordan following the short-lived pro-Axis coup by Rashid Ali al-Kaylani in 1941.

Upon his return to Iraq, he served in various senior capacities including President of the Senate of Iraq in the 1950s, and briefly as prime minister after the suspension of political activities during the Iraqi Intifada. He died on 26 October 1958 suffering from lung cancer.

Fourth Ministry 
When the Crown Prince 'Abd al-Ilah came back to Baghdad in 1 June 1941, He summoned Midfai to Him and after careful consultations, the opinion settled on Midfai to form a new government, so the Prince sent Him the following letter:
The circumstances in which Al-Madfai was tasked with forming his fifth cabinet were strict and required the appointment of ministers and determining their responsibilities so quickly that he could not think about the extent of the cooperation that would take place between him and his associates in the management of state affairs in these circumstances.
And accordingly, the royal will was issued on the second day of June 1941 to appoint:
Jamil Al-Midfai: the Prime Minister
Ali Jawdat al-Aiyubi: Minister of Foreign Affairs
Mustafa Mahmud al-Umari: Minister of Interior
Nadhif Al-Shawi: Minister of Defense
Ibrahim Kemal: Minister of Finance and Minister of Justice
Jalal Baban: Minister of Works and Communications
Nasrat al-Farisi: Minister of economy
Mohammed Ridha Al-Shabibi: Minister of Knowledge.

References

External links

1890 births
1958 deaths
Arabs from the Ottoman Empire
People from Mosul
Ottoman Military Academy alumni
Ottoman Army officers
Ottoman military personnel of World War I
Prime Ministers of Iraq
Finance ministers of Iraq
Presidents of the Senate of Iraq
Presidents of the Chamber of Deputies of Iraq
Iraqi exiles